Labraid is an Irish male name, it may refer to:

Labraid Loingsech, aka Labraid Lorc, a High King of Ireland.
Labraid Luathlám ar Claideb,  a figure in Irish mythology
Labraid Lámderg ("Red hand Labraid"), possible origin of the term Red Hand of Ulster